
Gmina Kwidzyn is a rural gmina (administrative district) in Kwidzyn County, Pomeranian Voivodeship, in northern Poland. Its seat is the town of Kwidzyn, although the town is not part of the territory of the gmina.

Villages
Gmina Kwidzyn contains the villages and settlements of Baldram, Brachlewo, Brokowo, Bronno, Bursztych, Bystrzec, Dankowo, Dubiel, Gilwa Mała, Gniewskie Pole, Górki, Grabówko, Gurcz, Janowo, Jurandowo, Kamionka, Korzeniewo, Kramrowo, Licze, Lipianki, Mały Baldram, Mareza, Nowa Wieś Kwidzyńska, Nowe Lignowy, Nowy Dwór, Obory, Ośno, Paczkowo, Pastwa, Pawlice, Piekarniak, Podzamcze, Pole Rakowieckie, Pólko Małe, Rakowice, Rakowiec, Rozpędziny, Stary Dwór, Szadowo, Szadowski Młyn, Szałwinek, Szopowo, Tychnowy and Wola-Sosenka.

Neighbouring gminas
Gmina Kwidzyn is bordered by the town of Kwidzyn and by the gminas of Gardeja, Gniew, Prabuty, Ryjewo and Sadlinki.

References

Polish official population figures 2006

Kwidzyn
Kwidzyn County